John Raleigh Mott (May 25, 1865 – January 31, 1955) was an evangelist and long-serving leader of the Young Men's Christian Association (YMCA) and the World Student Christian Federation (WSCF).  He received the Nobel Peace Prize in 1946 for his work in establishing and strengthening international Protestant Christian student organizations that worked to promote peace. He shared the prize with Emily Balch. From 1895 until 1920 Mott was the General Secretary of the WSCF. Intimately involved in the formation of the World Council of Churches in 1948, that body elected him as a lifelong honorary President. He helped found the World Student Christian Federation in 1895, the 1910 World Missionary Conference and the World Council of Churches in 1948. His best-known book, The Evangelization of the World in this Generation, became a missionary slogan in the early 20th century.

Biography
Mott was born in Livingston Manor, New York, Sullivan County, New York on May 25, 1865, and his family moved to Postville, Iowa in September of the same year. He attended Upper Iowa University, where he studied history and was an award-winning student debater. He transferred to Cornell University, where he received his bachelor's degree in 1888. He was influenced by Arthur Tappan Pierson one of the forces behind the Student Volunteer Movement for Foreign Missions, which was founded in 1886. 

In 1910, Mott, an American Methodist layperson, presided at the 1910 World Missionary Conference, which was an important milestone in the modern Protestant missions movement and some say the modern ecumenical movement.

Mott and a colleague were offered free passage on the Titanic in 1912 by a White Star Line official who was interested in their work, but they declined and took the more humble liner the SS Lapland. According to a biography by C. Howard Hopkins, upon hearing of the news in New York City, the two men looked at each other and remarked that, "The Good Lord must have more work for us to do."

After touring Europe and promoting ecumenism, Mott traveled to Asia where, from October 1912 to May 1913, he held a series of 18 regional and national conferences, including in Ceylon, India, Burma, Malaya, China, Korea and Japan.

He also worked with Robert Hallowell Gardiner III to maintain relations with the Russian Orthodox Church and Archbishop Tikhon after the Russian Revolution.

From 1920 until 1928, Mott served as the WSCF Chairperson. For his labors in both missions and ecumenism, as well as for peace, some historians consider him to be "the most widely traveled and universally trusted Christian leader of his time".

Personal life and legacy 
Mott married twice. His first wife was a teacher, Leila Ada White. They married in 1891 and had two sons and two daughters, including Irene Mott Bose, a social worker in India, and wife of Indian Supreme Court justice Vivian Bose; John Livingstone Mott, who received the Kaisar-i‐Hind silver medal in 1931, for his work with the YMCA in India; and Frederick Dodge Mott, who worked in healthcare planning in Canada, and was Canada's representative to the World Health Organization. 

After Leila Mott died in 1952, Mott remarried in 1953, to Agnes Peter, a descendant of Martha Custis Washington. He died in 1955, in Orlando, Florida, aged 89 years. The papers of John R. Mott are held at the Yale Divinity School Library.

Veneration
In 2022, John Raleigh Mott was officially added to the Episcopal Church liturgical calendar with a feast day on 3 October. Mott's homestead, located adjacent to the Van Tran Flat Covered Bridge, is listed on the State and National Register of Historic Places.

The high school of the Postville Community School District in Postville, Iowa is named after him.

Writings
The Evangelization of the World in This Generation (1900)
The Decisive Hour of Christian Missions (1910)
World Student Christian Federation  (1920)
Cooperation and the World Mission (1935)
Methodists United for Action (1939)
The Larger Evangelism (1945)

See also
 1910 World Missionary Conference
 Christian ecumenism
 History of religion in the United States
 International student ministry
List of peace activists

References

Further reading
 Cracknell, Kenneth and Susan J. White. An Introduction to World Methodism. Cambridge: Cambridge University Press, 2005. .
 Fisher, Galen Merriam. John R. Mott: Architect of Cooperation and Unity.  New York: Association Press, 1953.
 Hopkins, Charles Howard. John R. Mott, 1865–1955. Eerdmans, 1979. .
 Hopkins, C. Howard. History of the Y.M.C.A. in North America (1951)
 Mackie, Robert C. Layman Extraordinary: John R. Mott, 1865–1955. London, Hodder & Stoughton, 1965.
 Mathews, Basil Joseph. John R. Mott: World Citizen. New York, Harper, 1934.

Primary sources
 Mott, John Raleigh. The Future Leadership of the Church (1909) online.
 Mott, John Raleigh. The Evangelization of the World in This Generation.  Arno, 1972. .
 Mott, John R. Five decades and a forward view (1939), autobiography

External links

 
 World Student Christian Federation

YMCA leaders
1865 births
1955 deaths
Methodists from Iowa
American Nobel laureates
Cornell University alumni
Nobel Peace Prize laureates
People from Livingston Manor, New York
People from Rockland, New York
People of the World Council of Churches
Anglican saints
Upper Iowa University alumni
People from Postville, Iowa
American Methodist missionaries
World Christianity scholars
Commanders Crosses of the Order of Merit of the Federal Republic of Germany
Burials at Washington National Cathedral